Tumor necrosis factor (ligand) superfamily, member 12-member 13, also known as TNFSF12-TNFSF13, is a human gene.

This gene belongs to the tumor necrosis factor superfamily (TNFSF). It encodes a hybrid protein composed of the cytoplasmic and transmembrane domains of the family member 12 fused to the C-terminal domain of the family member 13. The hybrid protein is membrane anchored and presents the receptor-binding domain of the family member 13 at the cell surface. It stimulates cycling in T-lymphoma and B-lymphoma cell lines. The mRNA transcript is expressed and translated in primary T cells and monocytes.

References

Further reading